Daniel Dickinson may refer to:
 Daniel D. Stevens (Daniel Dickinson Stevens, 1839–1916), United States Navy sailor and Medal of Honor recipient
 Daniel A. Dickinson (1839–1902), Minnesota Supreme Court justice
 Daniel S. Dickinson (1800–1866), New York politician
 Daniel Dickinson, a character in the television series Warehouse 13